Malabar United Football Club is an Indian football club based in Malabar Region, Kerala. The club has formally played in the I-League 2nd Division alongside the Kerala Premier League.

History
Malabar United Football Club was founded in 2007 by Mohammed Mannil. They started off their history by playing in the local Cochin Premier League. They finished in the semi-finals in the 2008 Cochin Premier League. They then participated in the I-League 2nd Division for the first time in 2009 but did not get promoted. They then tried again in 2010 and 2011 but ultimately failed to gain promotion to the I-League. The club then skipped out of next season in the 2012 I-League 2nd Division.

References

Football clubs in Kerala
Association football clubs established in 2007
2007 establishments in Kerala
I-League 2nd Division clubs